was a town located in Tsuna District, Hyōgo Prefecture, Japan.

As of 2003, the town had an estimated population of 11,143 and a density of 191.43 persons per km². The total area was 58.21 km².

On February 11, 2006, Goshiki was merged into the expanded city of Sumoto.

It was twinned with Kronstadt, Russia.

References 

Dissolved municipalities of Hyōgo Prefecture
Sumoto, Hyōgo